Goniobranchus cazae is a species of colourful sea slug, a dorid nudibranch, a marine gastropod mollusc in the family Chromodorididae.

Distribution 
This species was described from Khawr Faddan, United Arab Emirates.

Description
Goniobranchus cazae is a bright opaque white chromodorid nudibranch with irregular, well-defined, dark purple blotches on the mantle and a mantle margin of the same colour. There are raised yellow-orange spots in the purple patches. The gills and rhinophores are bright white.

References

Chromodorididae
Gastropods described in 2004